Pseudognaphalium obtusifolium (formerly Gnaphalium obtusifolium) is a member of the family Asteraceae, found on open dry sandy habitat throughout Eastern North America. Common names include old field balsam, rabbit tobacco and sweet everlasting. When crushed, the plant exudes a characteristic maple-syrup scent.

Description
It is a biennial herb which grows up to one meter tall. In its first year, the plant produces tightly packed rosettes covered in wooly hair. In the second year, the plant produces a tall stem with alternate leaves and yellow peg-shaped flowerheads. These are borne in clusters. The seeds are dispersed by the wind. Its native habitats include dry clearings, fields, and edges of woods.

Uses by Native Americans

Alabama tribe
The Alabama tribe used a compound decoction of it as a treatment for nervousness and sleepiness, and a decoction as a face wash for nerves and insomnia.

Cherokee
The Cherokee use it in a compound for muscle cramps, local pains, and twitching, and apply an infusion of it over scratches made over muscle cramp pain. It is also used internally with Carolina Vetch for rheumatism. A decoction is taken for colds, and the plant is also made into cough syrup. It is used in a sweat bath to treat various diseases, made into a warm liquid blown down throat for clogged throat (diphtheria), chewed for a sore mouth or throat, and smoked for asthma.

Choctaw
The Choctaw use a decoction of leaves and blossoms taken for lung pain and colds.

Creek
The Creek add the leaves to medicines as a perfume, use a decoction to treat vomiting, as a throat wash for mumps, as a wash "for people who wanted to run away" and as a wash for people who are believed to be afflicted by ghosts. A decoction made of the plant tops is used as a wash for old people who are unable to sleep. They also use a compound decoction of plant tops as an inhalant for colds, and apply a poultice of decoction of leaves for the throat for mumps.

Koasati
The Koasati take a decoction of the leaves for fevers, and use it to bathe those who are feverish.

Menominee
The Menominee steam the dried leaves as an inhalant for headaches, and as a treatment against "foolishness". They also smudge the leaves and use them to fumigate premises to dispel ghosts, and to bring back "loss of mind". This smudge is also used to revive unconscious patients. The leaf smoke is blown into the nostrils of people who have fainted.

Montagnais
The Montagnais use a decoction of the plant for coughing and tuberculosis.

Rappahannock
The Rappahannock Tribe take an infusion of the roots for chills, smoke dried leaves or dried stems in a pipe for asthma, and chew the leaves for "fun".

References

Further reading
Clemants, Steve and Gracie, Carol Wildflowers in the Field and Forest: A Field Guide to the Northeastern United States Oxford University Press 2006. 294:5
Yatskievych, Kay Field Guide to Indiana Wildflowers Indiana University Press 2000. 229:1149

obtusifolium
Flora of North America
Plants described in 1753
Taxa named by Carl Linnaeus
Plants used in traditional Native American medicine